Crossabeg–Ballymurn GAA Club is located in County Wexford, Ireland. It is part of Wexford GAA. It is three miles (5 km) north of Wexford town and runs for approximately 11 miles (18 km) across like a figure eight. The parish consists of the two half parishes of Crossabeg and Ballymurn. The club takes the name of the parishes in which it is based (Parishes of County Wexford Ireland).

Early history
GAA games have been played in the two half parishes of Crossabeg and Ballymurn since 1886, but the two areas operated independently of one another for the first eighty years of Gaelic games, as each parish had its own team.
The club contested the first Wexford senior football final of 1886 losing to Rosslare. The club won the senior football final of 1897.

The first hurling highlight was in 1891 when Crossabeg–Ballymurn was Wexford's representative in the All Ireland championship which was lost Ballyduff after extra time. That was Kerry's only All Ireland hurling championship success.

The first two decades of the 20th century brought the area to hurling prominence and also proved to be a golden era for the parish as far as the top hurling honours were concerned.
Ballymurn recorded a first county title when winning the junior hurling championship of 1908 and this was quickly followed by senior success in 1910 and 1911. Crossabeg captured the Junior hurling title of 1914 and Ballymurn won it for the second time in 1916. Crossabeg were senior hurling champions in 1918 which was the last title they won as a separate club.
Ballymurn won the minor hurling championship of 1929 which was quickly followed by an Intermediate hurling title in 1930. They played senior hurling in the early 1930s and during that time they won the Echo Shield an important competition of that era.

Ballymurn then followed Crossabeg back into the junior grade where both half parishes operated for over 30 years very much independent of each other with little if any inter change of players.
There were no titles won and in some years a team might not be fielded at all, resulting in players throwing in their lot with neighbouring perishes, but never together.
The names of players from the Crossabeg and Ballymurn parishes are to be found playing with other teams in the surrounding areas such as Sallybeachers, Ardcolm, New Irelands, Oylegate, Glenbrien, Shelmaliers, Glynn and the Faythe Harriers throughout this period.

Current Club
As the clubs entered the 1960s a number of people led by Michael Sinnott and Cauley Gordan decided it was time to unite under one club to serve the area and so in 1966 the present day Crossabeg Ballymurn  came into being.

The new club entered a team in the junior championship but it took a number of years to gain any semblance of success.

In the early 1970s championship success was halted by St Fintains in the Wexford District final for three years in a row . In 1972 a first Wexford district junior hurling title was won when they beat St Fintans in the final. The club went on to contest its first county final that year losing out to Cloughbawn in the final.

Despite the loss the ambition of the club was aroused and in the following year a restructuring of hurling in the county saw the club opting to go up to the Intermediate grade which would lead to a 15-year quest filled with heartache and disappointment as the club sought to win its first adult title as a one parish club.

They contested the 1974 intermediate final losing on a replay to Gorey. They were beaten semi finalists in 1976, and were beaten in the final of 1977 by a rising St Martins side.
For the next ten years the club was always listed as one of the seasons fancied sides but the breakthrough never came.

In the meantime at underage level the club lost the 1973 minor hurling final to Rathnure / Duffry Rovers when teamed up with neighbours Oylegate. Two years later they won the U21 hurling title when joined with the Shelmaliers beating Gorey in the final.
In 1980 they united with Oylegate to win the Minor B hurling, beating ferns in the final, and again won the U21 hurling in 1982, beating a star-studded Rathnure / Cushinstown in the final. The club went it alone in 1986 and captured the U21B hurling title.
The underage teams of the early 1980s contained the players who would carry the club forward into the 1990s.

The tale of woe in adult finals  continued in 1984 when Gorey beat the junior B hurlers in the final.
In 1985 it was the junior B footballers who beat Castletown in the final to record a first adult success in football after all the effort to win a hurling title. However, as in the previous century the win signaled a change of fortune.
The Intermediate hurlers contested a first final in ten years when they lost the 1987 final to near neighbours Glynn / Barntown. The club was back the following year to beat Shamrocks in the final and to record a first adult hurling success in the parish for fifty eight years. This victory also saw the parish return to the top  senior grade of Wexford hurling.

The club more than held its own at senior level and in 1994 narrowly lost the senior semi final to Oulart/ Ballagh who went on to record their own first senior win. At underage level in 1994 the club contested its first premier minor hurling final as a single club losing out to Rathnure.
In 1995 the junior B hurlers won the final at the third attempt beating the Rapparees in the final having lost the 1989 final to Bannow / Ballymitty. This was the high tide mark of the club as each year that followed saw a gradual slippage until in 2000 the club was relegated from senior ranks. Worse was to follow when in 2003 saw the team relegated to junior ranks for the first time in thirty years.

The years since 2003 has seen the club founder in the junior ranks, and  has been a traumatic time for all involved as every one adjusted to their new status.
Out of recent disappointment has come  a renewed focus and determination to climb the hurling ladder once again however long it takes.
The club reached the junior hurling final of 2006 where they lost by a point to Our Lady's Island . Six members of the 2000 U12 hurling winning team were members of the 2006 junior hurling panel.
In 2008 the club were knocked out of the junior championship but went on to claim the junior shield when beating Geraldine O'Hanrahans, their first adult cup in thirteen years.

Planning for the future at underage
The club has enjoyed some success at underage level in the 1990s when they won 5 titles at various grades and over the seven years of the new century have added a further seven titles from u12 level up, including a first underage football title for the U12's.

The underage players are starting to flow into the adult teams and there is a good feeling  about the future again and as ever in Crossabeg Ballymurn success is not immediate but there is a determination to work hard at it, and to carry on the tradition of Gaelic games in the parish into a third century.

Achievements
 Wexford Senior Hurling Championships: 1
 1919
 Wexford Intermediate Hurling Championships: 1
 1930 (as Ballymurrin)
 Wexford Intermediate A Hurling Championships: 1
 2014
 Wexford Intermediate A Football Championships: 1
 2017
 Wexford Junior Hurling Championship: 3
 1914 (as Crossabeg), 2016 (as Ballymurrin), 2012
 Wexford Junior Football Championships:
 2012
 Wexford Under-21 Football Championships: 1
 2015
 Wexford Under-21 Hurling Championships: 3
 1975 (with Castlebridge), 1982 (with Oylegate), 2015
 Wexford Minor Hurling Championship: 1
 1929 (as Ballymurn)

Sources
1. County Wexford
2. Towns & Villages of Wexford

External links
 Wexford GAA
 Hogan Stand

References 

Gaelic games clubs in County Wexford
Hurling clubs in County Wexford